George Bright was Dean of St Asaph from 1689 until his death in 1696.

Bright was born in Epsom and educated at Emmanuel College, Cambridge. He was Chaplain to Mary, Princess of Orange and Rector of Loughborough.

References 

People from Epsom
Alumni of Emmanuel College, Cambridge
17th-century Welsh Anglican priests
Deans of St Asaph
1696 deaths